William N. Aswad (January 15, 1922 – August 13, 2015) was an American politician who was a member of the Vermont House of Representatives. He was an engineer by profession and manager of manufacturing engineering.

Aswad was born in Binghamton, New York in 1922. He attended Clarkson University and Union College, graduating the former with a major in chemical engineering in 1946. He was a veteran of World War II, serving in the Army Corps of Engineers, attaining the rank of major. A former city councillor in his hometown of Burlington, was elected to the Vermont House of Representatives in 1995, at the age of 72, and served until his defeat by Joanna E. Cole, a fellow Democrat, in 2012. During his time in the House, he served on the House Transportation Committee. In 2012, he was honored in the House with a resolution on his 90th birthday.

Aswad was a member of United Way and served on the Chittenden County Regional Planning Association, the Vermont Association for Development and Planning, Vermont Health Foundation, and as a president of the New England Association of Regional Councils. He died in Shelburne, Vermont on August 13, 2015 after a brief illness.

References

1922 births
2015 deaths
Politicians from Binghamton, New York
Politicians from Burlington, Vermont
Clarkson University alumni
Union College (New York) alumni
Democratic Party members of the Vermont House of Representatives
Vermont city council members
20th-century American engineers
20th-century American politicians
21st-century American politicians
Engineers from New York (state)
Engineers from Vermont
United States Army Corps of Engineers personnel
United States Army personnel of World War II
United States Army officers